Heartaches and Pain is an album by the American blues musician Carey Bell, recorded in Chicago in 1977, but not released by the Delmark label until 1994.

Reception

AllMusic reviewer Bill Dahl stated: "Legendary producer Ralph Bass supervised this quickie session back in 1977, but it failed to see the light of day domestically until Delmark rescued it from oblivion. They did the blues world a favor: it's a worthwhile session, Bell storming through a mostly original setlist". The Penguin Guide to Blues Recordings wrote: "Given the conditions, it's hardly surprising the musicians went for proficiency rather than inspiration ... One can't blame the musicians for the exploitative nature of the session but the results are invariably no more than pleasant".

Track listing
All compositions by Carey Bell except where noted
 "Carey Bell Rocks" − 3:27
 "Heartaches and Pains" − 5:42
 "One Day You're Gonna Get Lucky" − 3:31
 "Black-Eyed Peas" − 4:51
 "So Hard to Leave You Alone" − 6:56
 "Stop That Train, Conductor" (Doctor Clayton) − 3:36
 "Everythings Gonna' Be All Right" (Walter Jacobs) − 4:35
 "Capri Crash" − 4:36

Personnel
Carey Bell − harmonica, vocals
Bob Riedy − piano
Lurrie Bell − guitar (tracks 3-8)
Alabama Junior Pettis − rhythm guitar (tracks 1-3, 5, 6 & 8)
Aron Burton − bass
Sam Lay – drums

References

Delmark Records albums
1994 albums
Carey Bell albums
Albums produced by Ralph Bass